WIHG (105.7 FM, "The Hog") is a classic hits radio station licensed to Rockwood, Tennessee, United States.  The station is currently owned by John Tollett, through licensee 3B Properties, Inc. The station has obtained a construction permit from the FCC for a power increase to 2,400 watts.

History
The station went on the air as WOFE-FM on 1990-03-19. On 2003-06-11, the station changed its call sign to WWSR, on 2007-02-26 to WLSQ, and to its current WIHG on 2007-07-16.

References

External links

IHG
Radio stations established in 1992
1992 establishments in Tennessee